The women's team épée event at the 2020 Summer Olympics took place on 27 July 2021 at the Makuhari Messe. 24 fencers (8 teams of 3) from 8 nations competed.

Background 
This was the 6th appearance of the event, which has been held at every Summer Olympics since 1996 except 2008 (during the time when team events were rotated off the schedule, with only two of the three weapons for each of the men's and women's categories).

The reigning Olympic champion is Romania (Loredana Dinu, Simona Gherman, Simona Pop, and Ana Maria Popescu). The reigning World Champion is China (Lin Sheng, Sun Yiwen, Xu Anqi, and Zhu Mingye).

Qualification 

A National Olympic Committee (NOC) could enter a team of 3 fencers in the women's team épée. These fencers also automatically qualified for the individual event.

There are 8 dedicated quota spots for women's team épée. They are allocated as through the world team ranking list of 5 April 2021. The top 4 spots, regardless of geographic zone, qualify (China, Poland, ROC, and South Korea). The next four spots are allocated to separate geographic zones, as long as an NOC from that zone is in the top 16. These places went to Hong Kong (Asia/Oceania), the United States (Americas), and Italy (Europe); no team from Africa was in the top 16, so the place was reallocated to the next-best team regardless of zone: Estonia.

Additionally, there are 8 host/invitational spots that can be spread throughout the various fencing events. Japan qualified one women's épée fencer through normal individual qualification, but did not use host quota places to complete a women's épée team.

The COVID-19 pandemic delayed many of the events for qualifying for fencing, moving the close of the rankings period back to April 5, 2021 rather than the original April 4, 2020.

Competition format 
The 2020 tournament is a single-elimination tournament, with classification matches for all places. Each match features the three fencers on each team competing in a round-robin, with 9 three-minute bouts to 5 points; the winning team is the one that reaches 45 total points first or is leading after the end of the nine bouts. Standard épée rules regarding target area, striking, and priority are used.

Schedule 
The competition is held over a single day, Tuesday, 27 July. The first session runs from 11:25 a.m. to approximately 3:20 p.m. (when all matches except the bronze and gold medal finals are expected to conclude), after which there is a break until 6:30 p.m. before the medal bouts are held.

All times are Japan Standard Time (UTC+9)

Results 

5–8th place classification

Final classification

References

External links 
Draw 

Women's team épée
Women's events at the 2020 Summer Olympics
2021 in women's fencing